"Elle me contrôle" is a song by French singer M. Pokora written and composed by Georges Padey, Kore & Skalp, Matt Pokora, Da Team and Sweety. It was released as the second single from his first eponymous album in late spring 2005. Rapper Sweety featured the Kore & Skalp-produced song to add a dancehall groove to it. It won the NRJ Music Award for "Francophone Song of the Year" in 2006.

In 2015, the song saw a revival with a new version released by M. Pokora titled "Elle me contrôle (2015)" featuring Tenny.

Track listings
 CD 1 (green cover)
 "Elle me contrôle (feat. Sweety)"
 "Showbiz (The Battle)" live performance @ Génération Rap/RnB 2 in Bercy

 CD 2 (red cover)
 "Elle me contrôle (feat. Sweety)"
 "Elle me contrôle" music video

Music video 

The music video for "Elle me contrôle" was directed by Karim Ouaret. It won the NRJ Music Award for "Music Video of the Year" in 2006.

Charts and sales

Peak positions

Year-end charts

Certifications

Awards

References

2005 singles
French-language songs
M. Pokora songs
Songs written by M. Pokora
Songs written by Skalp
Songs written by Kore (producer)
2005 songs